The taiga shrew (Sorex isodon), also known as the even-toothed shrew can achieve a body length of about 67 millimeters, with a tail of about 43 millimeters. This shrew is very similar to the long-clawed shrew. This species inhabits forested mountain valleys, and is found across northern Eurasia. It ranges from the Baltic Sea area through the Lake Baikal region of Siberia into the Russian Far East and along the Baekdudaegan mountains of the Korean Peninsula.

References

External links
Zipcode Zoo

Sorex
Mammals of Korea
Mammals described in 1924